Ricky Cardell Hunley (born November 11, 1961) is an American football coach and former professional player who was a linebacker in the National Football League (NFL) for seven seasons during the 1980s and early 1990s. Hunley played college football for the University of Arizona, and was twice recognized as a consensus All-American. He was selected in the first round of the 1984 NFL Draft, and played professionally for the Denver Broncos, Arizona Cardinals and Los Angeles Raiders of the NFL. He is currently the defensive line coach at the University of Arizona in Tucson, his alma mater.

Early years
Hunley was born in Petersburg, Virginia, and graduated from Petersburg High School.

College playing career
Hunley attended the University of Arizona, where he played for the Arizona Wildcats football team from 1980 to 1983.  As a junior in 1982 and again as a senior in 1983, he was recognized as a consensus first-team All-American—and became the first Arizona Wildcat football player to receive consensus All-American honors.

In 1998, he was inducted into the College Football Hall of Fame–the first player from the University of Arizona to be enshrined.

Professional playing career
Hunley went on to an NFL career with the Denver Broncos (1984–87), Phoenix Cardinals (1988), and the Los Angeles Raiders (1989–90).  It is noted that Hunley was drafted by the Bengals but after failing to reach a contract agreement was traded to Denver.  Hunley played in both Super Bowl XXI and Super Bowl XXII for the Broncos. He was elected executive vice president of the NFL Players Association (1990–92).

Coaching career
Hunley coached on the collegiate level at the University of Southern California (1992–93), University of Missouri (1994–2000), University of Florida (2001), and the University of Memphis (2014-15). He helped the Florida Gators win the BCS FedEx 2002 Orange Bowl.

Hunley started his NFL coaching career through the NFL Minority Fellowship Coaching Program in 2002 as the defensive line coach for the Washington Redskins under Steve Spurrier, where he met Marvin Lewis. He then moved to Linebackers coach under Lewis for the Cincinnati Bengals from 2003 to 2007.

In 2005, Hunley helped the Bengals ended 15 years of futility by notching their first winning season since 1990 and winning the AFC North division title with an 11–5 record. Two years later in 2007, he was fired after a disappointing season and a flurry of player injuries and suspensions. During his time in the NFL, he also served on the board of directors for the Black Coaches Association.

Hunley coached for two seasons (2014–15) with the Memphis Tigers. In 2015, Hunley helped the Tigers post a 9-4 record, and an appearance in the Birmingham Bowl.

On December 30, 2020, Hunley is set to join Jedd Fisch's coaching staff as defensive line coach at University of Arizona in his alma mater.

Personal life
Hunley and his wife Camille have two daughters. His younger brother, Lamonte, was also an All-American linebacker at Arizona. He founded the Ricky Hunley Football Camp, a non-profit instruction center for high school boys.

References

External links
 Football Digest Article

1961 births
Living people
All-American college football players
American football linebackers
Arizona Wildcats football players
Sacramento Mountain Lions coaches
Cincinnati Bengals coaches
College Football Hall of Fame inductees
Denver Broncos players
Florida Gators football coaches
Los Angeles Raiders players
Missouri Tigers football coaches
Phoenix Cardinals players
USC Trojans football coaches
Washington Redskins coaches
African-American players of American football
Sportspeople from Petersburg, Virginia
Players of American football from Virginia
Memphis Tigers football coaches
21st-century African-American people
20th-century African-American sportspeople